Miguel Ángel Melogno (22 March 1905 – 27 March 1945) was an Uruguayan footballer who played 5 matches for Uruguay national team. He was part of the team which won the first ever World Cup in 1930. He has also won the gold medal with national team in 1928 Olympics, but he did not play in any matches. He played club football for Bella Vista Montevideo.

References

External links
World Cup Champions Squads 1930 - 2002
O nascimento da mítica Celeste Olímpica 

1905 births
Uruguayan people of Italian descent
Uruguayan footballers
Uruguay international footballers
1930 FIFA World Cup players
FIFA World Cup-winning players
Olympic footballers of Uruguay
Footballers at the 1928 Summer Olympics
Olympic gold medalists for Uruguay
C.A. Bella Vista players
1945 deaths
Olympic medalists in football
Medalists at the 1928 Summer Olympics
Association football midfielders